The 1967 Kentucky gubernatorial election was held on November 7, 1967. Republican nominee Louie Nunn defeated Democratic nominee Henry Ward with 51.20% of the vote.

Primary elections
Primary elections were held on May 23, 1967.

Democratic primary

Candidates
Henry Ward, former State Senator
Happy Chandler, former Governor
Harry Lee Waterfield, incumbent Lieutenant Governor
David Trapp
J.D. Buckman
Helen Breeden
William Shires
Jesse N.R. Cecil
Wilton Benge Cupp 	
W.E. Day

Results

Republican primary

Candidates
Louie Nunn, former Barren County judge
Marlow Cook, Jefferson County Judge/Executive
Thurman Jerome Hamlin, perennial candidate

Results

General election

Candidates
Major party candidates
Louie Nunn, Republican 
Henry Ward, Democratic

Other candidates
Christian Glanz, Independent

Results

References

1967
Kentucky
Gubernatorial
November 1967 events in the United States